Goodenia anfracta, commonly known as zig-zag hand-flower, is a species of flowering plant in the family Goodeniaceae and is endemic to central Australia. It is a prostrate or low-lying shrub with linear and lance-shaped to egg-shaped leaves, small racemes of yellow flowers with small, leaf-like bracteoles at the base, and more or less spherical fruit.

Description
Flowering has been observed in August and the fruit is a more or less spherical capsule.

Taxonomy and naming
Goodenia anfracta was first formally described in 1927 by John McConnell Black in the Transactions and proceedings of the Royal Society of South Australia from material collected by Richard Helms in 1891. The specific epithet (anfracta) means "zig-zag" or "crooked".

Distribution and habitat
Zig-zag hand-flower grows in saline sand, near salty springs or salt lakes in northern South Australia, southern parts of the Northern Territory and central-eastern Western Australia.

References

anfracta
Flora of South Australia
Flora of Western Australia
Flora of the Northern Territory
Plants described in 1927
Taxa named by John McConnell Black